Rhodri McAtee (born 2 August 1984 in Newport) is a Welsh rugby union player. A winger, he was selected for the victorious Wales Sevens squad to play at the 2009 Rugby World Cup Sevens. He was released by the Pirates at the end of the 2011–12 season and in 2012–13 will play for Plymouth Albion in the RFU Championship.

Career record
Cornish Pirates

References

1984 births
Living people
Barbarian F.C. players
Commonwealth Games rugby sevens players of Wales
Cornish Pirates players
Male rugby sevens players
Rugby sevens players at the 2006 Commonwealth Games
Rugby union players from Newport, Wales
Welsh rugby union players
Worcester Warriors players